Standards is the ninth solo album by former Parliament-Funkadelic keyboardist Bernie Worrell. The album was released in 2011 by Scufflin' Records.  This is a cover album, meaning none of these songs are originals written by Bernie, although he puts his signature funky twist on them, using a moog synthesizer on many of the songs.  All of the songs are jazz standards.

Track listing

Personnel 
Bernie Worrell - Piano, Synthesizer, Rhodes, Organ, Clavinet, Melodica 
Ronny Drayton - Guitar 
Smokey Hormel - Nylon string guitar, Guitar, Acoustic guitar, Baritone guitar 
Andrew Kimball - Guitar 
Kyle Cadena - Guitar 
Tim Luntzel - Upright bass, Bass 
Melvin Gibbs - Bass 
Evan Taylor - Drums 
JT Lewis - Drums 
Glen Fittin - Percussion, Vibraphone 
Chops Horns
Darryl Dixon - Alto Sax
David Watson - Tenor, Baritone sax, Flute
Jonathan Arons - Trombone
Freddie Hendrix - Trumpet, Flugel horn

Additional personnel
Darryl Dixon - Horn Arrangement
Bernie Worrell - Producer
Evan Taylor - Producer
Eric Spring - Recording, Mixing
Steve Berson - Mastering
Nina Chiminec - Production Assistant
Justin Emter - Photographs 
Agree R. Geronca - Art Direction

References

Bernie Worrell albums
2011 albums